The year 1661 in science and technology involved some significant events.

Biology
 Marcello Malpighi is the first to observe and correctly describe capillaries when he discovers them in a frog's lung.

Chemistry
 Robert Boyle's The Sceptical Chymist is published in London.

Environment
 John Evelyn's pamphlet Fumifugium is one of the earliest descriptions of air pollution.

Publications
 Abraham Cowley's pamphlet The Advancement of Experimental Philosophy.
 Johann Sperling's handbook Zoologia physica (posthumous).

Births
 May 3 – Antonio Vallisneri, Italian physician and natural scientist (died 1730)
 December 18 – Christopher Polhem, Swedish scientist and inventor (died 1751)
 Guillaume François Antoine, Marquis de l'Hôpital, French mathematician (died 1704)
 approx. date – Alida Withoos, Dutch botanical artist (died 1730)

Events
 Isaac Newton is admitted to Trinity College, Cambridge, as a sizar (June)

Deaths
 October – Gérard Desargues, French geometer (born 1591)

References

 
17th century in science
1660s in science